McLellan (also McLellen) is an unincorporated community in Santa Rosa County, Florida, United States.

Notable people
Hank Locklin, country music singer, was born in McLellan.

Notes

Unincorporated communities in Santa Rosa County, Florida
Unincorporated communities in Florida